Téji Tedy Savanier (born 22 December 1991) is a French professional footballer who plays as a midfielder for  club Montpellier, of which he is the captain.

Club career

Early career
Formed at his hometown club Montpellier, Savanier had only played for the reserve team when in 2011 he joined Arles-Avignon of Ligue 2. His first professional goal was his only of that season, opening a 3–0 home win over Lens on 24 September.

Nîmes
In August 2015, Savanier moved to fellow Ligue 2 club Nîmes on a one-year deal with a clause allowing a second season. Two years later, he extended his link until 2020. In 2017–18, he helped the Crocodiles to second place and promotion to Ligue 1 for the first time since 1993. He and teammates Umut Bozok and Rachid Alioui made the league's Team of the Year at the Trophées UNFP du football.

In 2018–19, his debut top-flight season, Savanier helped Nîmes come 9th. He led the league in assists with 14, ahead of Ángel Di María and Nicolas Pépé on 11 each, and surpassed only by Eden Hazard (15) in Europe's five largest leagues. Near the start of the season he was involved in a controversy in a 4–2 home loss to Paris Saint-Germain in which he was sent off for a foul on Kylian Mbappé, who was also given a red card for pushing him in retaliation.

Return to Montpellier
In July 2019, Savanier returned to Montpellier for an estimated €10 million fee, a club record. He became a key part of the team under manager Michel Der Zakarian.

After the retirement of 43-year-old club veteran Vitorino Hilton, Savanier succeeded him as captain of Montpellier in 2021. In December that year, he was UNFP Player of the Month for his two goals and two assists.

International career
Savanier was named as one of three overage players for the French Olympic team for the 2020 tournament in Japan. In the second group game, he scored the added-time winner in a 4–3 victory over South Africa.

Personal life
Born in Montpellier to a Romani family, Savanier still lives with his parents in Figuerolles, a banlieue of the city. When he played for Arles, one hour away, he rented with his mother.

Honours
Individual
UNFP Player of the Month: December 2021

References

External links
France profile at FFF
Téji Savanier profile at foot-national.com

1991 births
Living people
Footballers from Montpellier
French footballers
Association football midfielders
Montpellier HSC players
AC Arlésien players
Nîmes Olympique players
Ligue 1 players
Ligue 2 players
Championnat National 2 players
Championnat National 3 players
Olympic footballers of France
Footballers at the 2020 Summer Olympics
French Romani people
French people of Romani descent
Romani footballers